The New Zealand Warriors 2008 season was the New Zealand Warriors 14th first-grade season. The club competed in Australasia's National Rugby League. The coach of the team was Ivan Cleary while Steve Price was the club's captain.

Milestones
31 March – Round 3: Grant Rovelli played in his 50th match for the club.
19 April – Round 6: Lance Hohaia played in his 100th match for the club.
22 June – Round 15: Sam Rapira played in his 50th match for the club.
14 September – Qualifying Finals: The Warriors become the first team finishing eighth to beat the minor premiers when they defeat the Melbourne Storm, 18 – 15.
October–November: 11 players from the club participated in the World Cup: Steve Price, Brent Tate (Australia), Nathan Fien, Lance Hohaia, Simon Mannering, Sam Rapira, Jerome Ropati, Evarn Tuimavave, Manu Vatuvei (New Zealand), Ian Henderson (Scotland), Epalahame Lauaki (Tonga). In addition, John Ackland coached Samoa and Wairangi Koopu played for the New Zealand Māori side in the Welcome to Country match.

Jersey & Sponsors

Fixtures 

The Warriors used Mt Smart Stadium as their home ground in 2008, their only home ground since they entered the competition in 1995.

Trial Matches

Regular season

Finals

Ladder

Squad 

Twenty Six players played for the club in 2008. Eight players made their debut for the club, including five who were also making their first grade debuts.

Staff
Chief Executive Officer: Wayne Scurrah

NRL Staff
Head coach: Ivan Cleary
Assistant coach: John Ackland
Football Manager: Don Mann, Jr.
Club Doctor: John Mayhew
Trainer: Craig Walker

NYC Staff
Head coach: Tony Iro
Team Manager: Dean Bell

Transfers

Gains

Losses

Other Teams
In 2008 the Junior Warriors competed in the new Under 20's competition, the Toyota Cup, while Senior players who were not required for the first team played with the Auckland Vulcans in the NSW Cup. The Auckland Vulcans were coached by Bernie Perenara. Wayne McDade was named the Vulcans player of the year with Aaron Heremaia as the runner up and Pita Godinet as the Rookie of the year.

Junior Warriors

The Junior Warriors finished third in the Toyota Cup, making the finals before losing to the Brisbane Broncos in a Preliminary Final. Both Russell Packer and Ben Matulino were named in the Toyota Cup's team of the year.

Awards
Simon Mannering won the Player of the Year award.

References

External links
Warriors official site
NRL 2008 – Warriors rugbyleagueproject.org

New Zealand Warriors seasons
New Zealand Warriors season
War